Tomás Bán Ó Conceanainn (16 November 1870 – 20 April 1961; Thomas Concannon) was an Irish writer and historian.

Life
Ó Conceanainn was born in Inis Meáin, a son of Páidín Ó Conceanainn and Anne Ní Fathartaigh. He was educated on the island and at the Patrician national school in Galway. In 1885 he went to the US with his brother, attending Boston College and Liveamore College, California, graduating from Eastman College, New York, with a M.A. in accountancy. He set up practice in Mexico.

Returning to Ireland in 1898 on holiday he became involved with the Gaelic League, so much so that he remained in the country as one of its organisers. On a 1905 journey to the USA with Douglas Hyde, they collected twenty thousand dollars. However, they returned it for the relief of San Francisco in the aftermath of the 1906 earthquake. He remained an organiser until 1911. 

In 1912 PH Pearse attempted to persuade him to recruit backers for Pearse's boys' and girls' bilingual Montessori secondary schools Sgoil Éanna and Sgoil Íde, on a percentage basis, but he declined; Seán T Ó Ceallaigh took on the work. Concannon's nephew, Brian Seoighe, was a brilliant student in Sgoil Éanna.

He married 
Helena Walsh – the writer Helena Concannon. The couple collaborated on a number of books. He retired in 1938, and was awarded an honorary LL.D. by University College, Galway. He died in Galway in 1946.

See also
 Concannon Vineyard
 Kings of Uí Díarmata

Select bibliography
 Mion-Chomhradh. Leabhar Cainte Gaedhilge-Bearla, Dublin, 1904
 Seoda na Sean. Cuid I, with Helena Concannon, 1924.

References

 Galway Authors, Helen Maher, 1976
 http://www.ainm.ie/Bio.aspx?ID=187

External links
 http://www.smo.uhi.ac.uk/~oduibhin/duibhin.htm

1870 births
1961 deaths
20th-century Irish historians
People from County Galway
Irish writers